Ralph Herman Abraham (born July 4, 1936) is an American mathematician. He has been a member of the faculty of the University of California, Santa Cruz (where he is currently professor emeritus of mathematics) since 1968.

Life and work 
Abraham earned his BSE (1956), MS (1958) and PhD (1960) from the University of Michigan. Prior to joining Santa Cruz, he held positions at the University of California, Berkeley (research lecturer in mathematics; 1960-1962), Columbia University (postdoctoral fellow and assistant professor of mathematics; 1962-1964) and Princeton University (assistant professor of mathematics; 1964-1968). He has also held visiting positions in Amsterdam, Paris, Warwick, Barcelona, Basel, and Florence.

He founded the Visual Math Institute at Santa Cruz in 1975; at that time, it was called the "Visual Mathematics Project". He is editor of World Futures and for the International Journal of Bifurcations and Chaos. Abraham is a member of cultural historian William Irwin Thompson's Lindisfarne Association.

Abraham has been involved in the development of dynamical systems theory since the 1960s and 1970s. He has been a consultant on chaos theory and its applications in numerous fields, such as medical physiology, ecology, mathematical economics, psychotherapy, etc.

Another interest of Abraham's concerns alternative ways of expressing mathematics, for example visually or aurally.  He has staged performances in which mathematics, visual arts and music are combined into one presentation.

Abraham developed an interest in "Hip" activities in Santa Cruz in the 1960s and has a website gathering information on the topic. He credits his use of the psychedelic drug DMT for "swerv[ing his] career toward a search for the connections between mathematics and  the experience of the Logos".

Works
Publications
 1978. Foundations of Mechanics, 2nd edn. With Jerrold E. Marsden; 1st edition 1967.
 1982. Manifolds, Tensor Analysis, and Applications, 2nd edn. With Jerrold E. Marsden and Tudor Ratiu.
 1992. Dynamics, the Geometry of Behavior, 2nd edn. With C. D. Shaw.
 1992. Trialogues on the Edge of the West. With Terence McKenna and Rupert Sheldrake),
 1992. Chaos, Gaia, Eros.
 1995. The Web Empowerment Book. With Frank Jas and Will Russell.
 1995. Chaos in Discrete Dynamical Systems. With Laura Gardini and Christian Mira.
 1997. The Evolutionary Mind. With Terence McKenna and Rupert Sheldrake.
 2000. The Chaos Avant-garde. With Yoshisuke Ueda.
 2011. Bolts From the Blue.
 2016. Hip Santa Cruz, Vol. 1.
Film
 1989. The Strange New Science of Chaos, as himself
 2009. Cognition Factor 2009, as himself
 2010. DMT: The Spirit Molecule, as himself

References

External links 
 Personal website Ralph Abraham.
 
 Cognition Factor – 2009 film participant.

1936 births
20th-century American mathematicians
21st-century American mathematicians
Columbia University faculty
Complex systems scientists
Living people
Chaos theorists
People from Burlington, Vermont
University of California, Berkeley College of Letters and Science faculty
University of California, Santa Cruz faculty
University of Michigan College of Engineering alumni
Mathematicians from Vermont
Fulbright alumni